This is a list of tennis players who have represented the Poland Fed Cup team in an official Fed Cup match. Poland have taken part in the competition since 1966.

Players

References

External links
Polski Związek Tenisowy

Fed Cup
Lists of Billie Jean King Cup tennis players